Mickey Fitzgerald (born April 10, 1957 in Lynchburg, Virginia) is a former American football player.
He is the oldest of his three brothers. In 2002 Mickey was inducted into the Virginia Tech Sports Hall of Fame and in 2007, inducted in the Central Virginia Hall of Fame He played on the active roster in the NFL with the Atlanta Falcons and Philadelphia Eagles in 1981.

Personal life 
Mickey Fitzgerald was raised in a Catholic orphanage after his mother witnessed her lover getting shot, which made her felt that she isn't any good at parenting. During his day in the orphanage, Mickey hid in the corner most of the time, Mickey recalls that the Nuns had a love of smacking kids with rulers. He was lucky that a priest named Father Paul took care of him and the others, taking them to ball games and dedicating his time to the kids.  It was during this time that he met his lifelong friend, Jim Lucy, fellow fullback at E.C. Glass High School.

After two years in the orphanage, his grandmother took him and his siblings home. At home, Mickey started high school at E. C. Glass High School in Lynchburg, Virginia playing football. He was great at football, that he got many scholarships, which landed him at Virginia Tech.

Sports and After 
Mickey Fitzgerald played fullback for the Atlanta Falcons in 1981, but due to a knee injury during the preseason, he moved to the Philadelphia Eagles. After leaving the Philadelphia Eagles, Mickey Fitzgerald played for the Memphis Showboats for a few seasons. Due to his injuries, he left his football career and moved into real estate and was also a sumo wrestler in Japan. Years after his career, Fitzgerald had a son of his own named Nicholas "Austin Edward Memphis" Fitzgerald.

References

Living people
American football running backs
Virginia Tech Hokies football players
1957 births
Sportspeople from Lynchburg, Virginia